Sister My Sister is a 1994 film starring British actresses Julie Walters, Joely Richardson, and Jodhi May. The film was directed by Nancy Meckler and written by Wendy Kesselman, based on her own play, My Sister in This House.

The film is based on a true incident in Le Mans, France in 1933 called the Papin murder case, where two sisters brutally murdered their employer and her daughter. The murder shocked the country, and there was much speculation about the sisters, including allegations that they were having an incestous lesbian affair.

Plot 
In 1933 France, Christine (Richardson) is the maid of a well-to-do middle-aged widow (Julie Walters) and her teenage daughter (Sophie Thursfield). Her younger sister, Lea (May) is hired on the recommendation of Christine. The two sisters become increasingly alienated from their employer, separated by barriers between the classes. The employer and her daughter look down on the sisters for the most trivial things, and it soon becomes the norm for the two pairs of women to not even speak directly to each other.

With only each other to turn to, the sisters' relationship becomes sexual, adding to the tension between the sisters and their employer. Both of them deal with trauma brought on by strained relationships with their mother and others of the church. Over time, there are continual rumors of the employer’s daughter getting married and moving out. Christine becomes paranoid and jealous that Lea will go with her when that day comes, and she’ll be left with nothing and no one, but Lea assures her this isn’t the case. Christine fears she is a monster like her mother.

One day, the iron blows a fuse and burns the daughter’s blouse Lea was preparing. Short on money and time, the sisters resign themselves to their fate; when their employer and her daughter return from a shopping trip, Christine tries to explain what happened. The widow claims she knows about the incestuous relationship between the sisters and they’ll never work again once word gets out.  The sisters fly into a rage and brutally murder the widow and her daughter. The movie ends on a crime report detailing the state of the corpses as someone knocks on the mansion door. The sisters cling to each other desperately as audio plays of an investigator questioning them about the murder, followed by Christine screaming for Lea.

Cast 
Julie Walters as Madame Danzard
Joely Richardson as Christine Papin
Jodhi May as Lea Papin
Sophie Thursfield as Isabelle Danzard
Amelda Brown as Visitor #1
Lucita Pope as Visitor #2
Kate Gartside as Sister Veronica
Aimee Schmidt as Young Lea
Gabriella Schmidt as Young Christine

Related films 

The Papin case was also the subject of The Maids, a play by Jean Genet written in 1949 that was adapted by Christopher Miles into a 1974 film of the same name. It starred Glenda Jackson and Susannah York as the maids, and Vivien Merchant as their employer.

It is also mentioned in a 1995 French film of Claude Chabrol, La Cérémonie, with Isabelle Huppert and Sandrine Bonnaire.  The characters are not the Papin sisters, but are two women that end up murdering their employer. It is an adaptation from the novel A Judgement in Stone by Ruth Rendell.

The story was also filmed as Murderous Maids, a French film starring Sylvie Testud and Julie-Marie Parmentier, and directed by Jean-Pierre Denis.

See also 
 List of LGBT-related films directed by women

References

External links 
 

1995 films
British LGBT-related films
Lesbian-related films
Incest in film
Films shot at Pinewood Studios
Maids in films
1994 drama films
1994 films
British drama films
Films scored by Stephen Warbeck
1995 drama films
1990s English-language films
1990s British films